Dominica is divided into ten parishes. The largest parish by population in Dominica is Saint George which contains the capital city Roseau and has a total population of 21,241. The smallest parish by population is Saint Peter with 1,430 residents.

Parishes

See also
ISO 3166-2:DM
List of Caribbean First-level Subdivisions by Total Area
Commonwealth Local Government Forum-Americas

References

 
Subdivisions of Dominica
Dominica, Parishes
Dominica 1
Parishes, Dominica
Parishes

ast:Dominica#Organización políticu-alministrativa
de:Dominica#Verwaltungsgliederung
gl:Dominica#Organización político-administrativa
hu:Dominikai Közösség#Közigazgatási felosztás
no:Dominica#Prestegjeld